"You Got the Right One, Baby, Uh Huh" was a popular slogan for PepsiCo's Diet Pepsi brand in the United States and Canada from 1990 to 1993. A series of television ads featured singer Ray Charles, surrounded by models, singing a song about Diet Pepsi, entitled "You Got the Right One Baby, Uh Huh". The tag-phrase of the song included the words "Uh Huh!", which, as part of the ad campaign, were featured on Diet Pepsi packaging. Later, after Diet Pepsi phased out the aspartame / saccharin mix in favor of a 100% aspartame formula, many commercials ended with an announcer saying, "With 100% Uh Huh" replacing the earlier "With 100% NutraSweet".

The advertising campaign was created for Pepsi by BBD&O, a major New York advertising agency, and the song used in the commercials, entitled "Ray's Song" was penned by the team at Sunday Productions, also of New York City. One of the commercials was directed by Joe Pytka.

Another songwriter penned a composition with the same tag-line, and unsuccessfully attempted to receive credit for the commercial.

According to him: The song was written (as a love song) in 1989 by Arthur Takeall of Annapolis, Maryland, first performed over radio station WEBB in Baltimore. Takeall has a registered copyright on the song and owner of the Federal Registered Trademark, "You Got the Right One, Baby, Uh Huh".

Prince's recording of his track 'Uh Huh' has often led to the mistaken belief that Prince wrote the jingle used in the commercials.

But the song was written by Diet Pepsi creative director Alfred Merrin and jingle writer Peter Cofield, who tried to tailor the catchphrase "the right one" to Ray Charles' delivery and consequently added "baby".
Charles' backing singers The Raelettes then added "Uh huh" after playing around with other two-syllable alternatives, such as "doo-woo".

Version
The Indian version of the slogan, Yehi hai right choice, Baby (This is the Right Choice, Baby) in Hinglish, by Pepsi became immensely popular in the 1990s. The TV commercial directed the Mukul Anand, featured singer Remo Fernandes and actress Juhi Chawla, while its sequel saw actor Aamir Khan and Aishwariya Rai, then a model. It has since become a catchphrase in Indian popular culture.

In popular culture
The song's title quickly became a catchphrase across North America, and was referenced in various television shows and movies of the time, including The Cosby Show, Foofur, The Fresh Prince of Bel-Air, Coneheads and Rookie of the Year. The commercials themselves played on the parodies. One series of commercials showed people who opened cans of Diet Pepsi being thanked by Ray Charles and his backup singers with an "uh huh" (or the occasion "uh uh" for people who drank diet sodas from rival companies). Another commercial showed unsuccessful auditions with gangsta rappers, heavy metal bands and opera singers participating in a contest all singing "You Got The Right One Baby", in their most original format. A cash prize would be awarded to the best original rendition of "You Got The Right One Baby, uh huh". over 300,000 videos were submitted, to that extent Diet Pepsi awarded 10 first place prizes to the best and most original renditions. There was also a parody on Animaniacs in Chalkboard Bungle.

See also
Catchphrase
Pepsi

References

External links
 The Pepsi Legacy 1990 - Pepsi advertising history at PepsiWorld.com

American advertising slogans
Ray Charles
Super Bowl commercials
PepsiCo advertising campaigns
1990 neologisms